Mualim  is an island in Duke of York Islands archipelago in Papua New Guinea. Due to rising sea levels limiting land on the island, residents reportedly travel to other islands for food, firewood and water.

References

Islands of Papua New Guinea
Islands Region (Papua New Guinea)